The Downfall is a mountain (about 1,500 m) between the heads of Arago Glacier and Woodbury Glacier on the west coast of Graham Land. Mapped by the Falkland Islands Dependencies Survey (FIDS) from photos taken by Hunting Aerosurveys Ltd. in 1956–57. So named by the United Kingdom Antarctic Place-Names Committee (UK-APC) in 1960 because the feature marked the end of the route from Orel Ice Fringe by which members of the FIDS at Danco Island station had hoped in 1956 to reach Forbidden Plateau. A very steep drop on the east side of the summit precludes further progress.

References

Downfall, The